On 29 January 2010, the IUCN Red List of Threatened Species identified 842 (746 animals, 96 plants) extinct species, subspecies and varieties, stocks and sub-populations.

Kingdom Animalia

Phylum Arthropoda

Class Arachnida

Order Holothyrida

 Family Holothyridae
 Dicrogonatus gardineri

Order Opiliones

 Family Podoctidae
 Centrobunus braueri

Subphylum Crustacea

Order Amphipoda

 Family Crangonyctidae
 Stygobromus lucifugus

Order Calanoida

 Family Diaptomidae
 Tropodiaptomus ctenopus

Order Cyclopoida

 Family Cyclopidae
 Afrocyclops pauliani

Order Decapoda

 Family Atyidae
 Syncaris pasadenae

Order Podocopida

 Family Candonidae
 Namibcypris costata
 Family Cyprididae
 Liocypris grandis

Class Diplopoda

Order Spirobolida

 Family Pachybolidae
 Eucarlia

Class Insecta

Order Coleoptera

 Family Carabidae
 Mecodema punctellum
 Family Curculionidae
 Dryophthorus distinguendus
 Oedemasylus laysanensis
 Pentarthrum blackburni
 Rhyncogonus bryani
 Trigonoscuta rossi
 Trigonoscuta yorbalindae
 Family Dytiscidae
 Hygrotus artus
 Megadytes ducalis
 Rhantus novacaledoniae
 Rhantus orbignyi
 Rhantus papuanus
 Perrin's cave beetle (Siettitia balsetensis)

Order Diptera

 Family Dolichopodidae 
 Campsicnemus mirabilis
 Family Drosophilidae
 Drosophila lanaiensis
 Family Tabanidae
 Stonemyia volutina

Order Ephemeroptera

 Family Ephemeridae
 Pentagenia robusta
 Family Siphlonuridae
 Acanthometropus pecatonica

Order Hemiptera

 Family Pseudococcidae
 Clavicoccus erinaceus
 Phyllococcus oahuensis

Order Lepidoptera

 Family Coleophoridae
 Coleophora leucochrysella
 Family Geometridae
 Kona giant looper moth (Scotorythra megalophylla)
 Scotorythra nesiotes
 Tritocleis microphylla
 Family Libytheidae
 Libythea cinyras
 Family Lycaenidae
 Deloneura immaculata
 Xerces blue (Glaucopsyche xerces)
 Lepidochrysops hypopolia
 Family Nepticulidae
 American chestnut moth (Ectodemia castaneae)
 Phleophagan chestnut moth (Ectodemia phleophaga)
 Family Noctuidae
 Poko noctuid moth (Agrotis crinigera)
 Midway noctuid moth (Agrotis fasciata)
 Kerr's noctuid moth (Agrotis kerri)
 Laysan noctuid moth (Agrotis laysanensis)
 Agrotis photophila
 Procellaris grotis noctuid moth (Agrotis procellaris)
 Confused moth (Helicoverpa confusa)
 Minute noctuid moth (Helicoverpa minuta)
 Laysan dropseed noctuid moth (Hypena laysanensis)
 Hilo noctuid moth (Hypena newelli)
 Lovegrass noctuid moth (Hypena plagiota)
 Kaholuamano noctuid moth (Hypena senicula)
 Family Pyralidae
 Genophantis leahi
 Oeobia sp. nov.
 Family Tischeriidae
 Chestnut clearwing moth (Tischeria perplexa)
 Family Zygaenidae
 Levuana moth (Levuana iridescens)

Order Odonata

 Family Coenagrionidae
 Megalagrion jugorum
 Family Libellulidae
 Sympetrum dilatatum

Order Orthoptera

 Family Acrididae
 Conozoa hyalina
 Family Tettigoniidae
 Neduba extincta

Order Phasmatodea

 Family Diapheromeridae
 Pseudobactricia ridleyi

Order Plecoptera

 Family Chloroperlidae
 Alloperla roberti

Order Trichoptera

 Family Hydropsychidae
 Tobias' caddisfly (Hydropsyche tobiasi)
 Family Leptoceridae
 Triaenodes phalacris
 Triaenodes tridontus
 Family Rhyacophilidae
 Rhyacophila amabilis

Phylum Chordata

Class Actinopterygii

Order Cypriniformes

 Family Catostomidae
 Snake River sucker (Chasmistes muriei)
 Harelip sucker (Moxostoma lacerum)
 Family Cyprinidae
 Acanthobrama hulensis
 Beyşehir bleak (Alburnus akili)
 İznik shemaya (Alburnus nicaeensis)
 Barbus microbarbis
 Chondrostoma scodrense
 Cyprinus yilongensis
 Mexican dace (Evarra bustamantei)
 Plateau chub (Evarra eigenmanni)
 Endorheic chub (Evarra tlahuacensis)
 Thicktail chub (Gila crassicauda)
 Pahranagat spinedace (Lepidomeda altivelis)
 Durango shiner (Notropis aulidion)
 Phantom shiner (Notropis orca)
 Salado shiner (Notropis saladonis)
 Clear Lake splittail (Pogonichthys ciscoides)
 Las Vegas dace (Rhinichthys deaconi)
 Danube delta gudgeon (Romanogobio antipai)
 Stumptooth minnow (Stypodon signifer)
 Telestes ukliva

Order Cyprinodontiformes

 Family Cyprinodontidae
 Aphanius splendens
 Cyprinodon ceciliae
 Cachorrito de la Trinidad (Cyprinodon inmemoriam)
 Parras pupfish (Cyprinodon latifasciatus)
 Perritos de sandia (Cyprinodon spp.)
 Ash Meadows killifish (Empetrichthys merriami)
 Family Poeciliidae
 Aplocheilichthys sp. nov. 'Naivasha'
 Amistad gambusia (Gambusia amistadensis)
 San Marcos gambusia (Gambusia georgei)
 Pantanodon madagascariensis
 Graceful priapella (Priapella bonita)

Order Gasterosteiformes

 Family Gasterosteidae
 Techirghiol stickleback (Gasterosteus crenobiontus)

Order Perciformes

 Family Cichlidae
 Ctenochromis pectoralis
 Haplochromis arcanus
 Haplochromis artaxerxes
 Haplochromis bartoni
 Haplochromis boops
 Haplochromis cassius
 Haplochromis decticostoma
 Haplochromis dentex
 Haplochromis estor
 Haplochromis flavipinnis
 Haplochromis gilberti
 Haplochromis gowersi
 Haplochromis longirostris
 Haplochromis macrognathus
 Haplochromis mandibularis
 Haplochromis martini
 Haplochromis michaeli
 Haplochromis mylergates
 Haplochromis nanoserranus
 Haplochromis nigrescens
 Haplochromis nyanzae
 Haplochromis obtusidens
 Haplochromis pachycephalus
 Haplochromis paraguiarti
 Haplochromis paraplagiostoma
 Haplochromis percoides
 Haplochromis pharyngomylus
 Haplochromis prognathus
 Haplochromis pseudopellegrini
 Haplochromis teegelaari
 Haplochromis thuragnathus
 Ptychochromis onilahy
 Ptychochromis sp. nov. 'Kotro'
 Ptychochromoides itasy
 Pyxichromis parorthostoma
 Tristramella intermedia
 Tristramella magdelainae
 Xystichromis bayoni
 Family Percidae
 Maryland darter (Etheostoma sellare)

Order Salmoniformes

 Family Retropinnidae
 New Zealand grayling (Prototroctes oxyrhynchus)
 Family Salmonidae
Longjaw cisco (Coregonus alpenae)
 Coregonus bezola
 Coregonus fera
 Coregonus gutturosus
 Gravenche (Coregonus hiemalis)
 Deepwater cisco (Coregonus johannae)
 Blackfin cisco (Coregonus nigripinnis)
 Houting (Coregonus oxyrinchus)
 Coregonus restrictus
 Salmo pallaryi
 Silver trout (Salvelinus agassizi)
 Salvelinus neocomensis
 Salvelinus profundus

Order Scorpaeniformes

 Family Cottidae
 Utah Lake sculpin (Cottus echinatus)

Order Siluriformes

 Family Trichomycteridae
 Rhizosomichthys totae

Class Amphibia

Order Anura

 Family Bufonidae
 Atelopus vogli
 Golden toad (Incilius periglenes)
 Family Dicroglossidae
 Nannophrys guentheri
 Family Hylidae
 Phrynomedusa fimbriata
 Family Myobatrachidae
 Gastric-brooding frog (Rheobatrachus silus)
 Gastric-brooding frog (Rheobatrachus vitellinus)
 Mount Glorious day frog (Taudactylus diurnus)
 Family Ranidae
 Vegas Valley leopard frog (Lithobates fisheri)
 Family Rhacophoridae
 Philautus adspersus
 Philautus dimbullae
 Philautus eximius
 Philautus extirpo
 Philautus halyi
 Philautus leucorhinus
 Philautus maia
 Philautus malcolmsmithi
 Philautus nanus
 Philautus nasutus
 Philautus oxyrhynchus
 Philautus pardus
 Philautus rugatus
 Philautus stellatus
 Philautus temporalis
 Philautus variabilis
 Philautus zal
 Philautus zimmeri

Order Urodela

 Family Plethodontidae
 Ainsworth's salamander (Plethodon ainsworthi)
 Family Salamandridae
 Yunnan lake newt (Cynops wolterstorffi)

Class Aves

Order Accipitriformes

 Family Accipitridae
 Bermuda hawk (Bermuteo avivorus)

Order Anseriformes

 Family Anatidae
 Réunion sheldgoose (Alopochen kervazoi)
 Mauritius sheldgoose (Alopochen mauritianus)
 Amsterdam wigeon (Anas marecula)
 Mascarene teal (Anas theodori)
Labrador duck (Camptorhynchus labradorius)
 Finsch's duck (Chenonetta finschi)
 New Zealand merganser (Mergus australis)

Order Bucerotiformes

 Family Upupidae
 Saint Helena hoopoe (Upupa antaios)

Order Caprimulgiformes

 Family Trochilidae
 Brace's emerald (Chlorostilbon bracei)
 Gould's emerald (Chlorostilbon elegans)

Order Charadriiformes

 Family Alcidae
 Great auk (Pinguinus impennis)
 Family Haematopodidae
 Canary Islands oystercatcher (Haematopus meadewaldoi)
 Family Scolopacidae
 North Island snipe (Coenocorypha barrierensis)
 South Island snipe (Coenocorypha iredalei)
 Christmas sandpiper (Prosobonia cancellata)
 Moorea sandpiper (Prosobonia ellisi)
 Tahiti sandpiper (Prosobonia leucoptera)

Order Columbiformes

 Family Columbidae
 Mauritius blue pigeon (Alectroenas nitidissimus)
 Rodrigues blue pigeon (Alectroenas payandeei)
 Tanna ground dove (Alopecoenas ferruginea)
 Thick-billed ground dove (Alopecoenas salamonis)
 Spotted green pigeon (Caloenas maculata)
 Ryukyu wood pigeon (Columba jouyi)
 Mauritian wood pigeon (Columba thiriouxi)
 Bonin wood pigeon (Columba versicolor)
 Passenger pigeon (Ectopistes migratorius)
 Choiseul pigeon (Microgoura meeki)
 Mauritian turtle dove (Nesoenas cicur)
 Réunion pink pigeon (Nesoenas duboisi)
 Rodrigues pigeon (Nesoenas rodericanus)
 Rodrigues solitaire (Pezophaps solitaria)
 Red-moustached fruit dove (Ptilinopus mercierii)
 Dodo (Raphus cucullatus)

Order Cuculiformes

 Family Cuculidae
 Delalande's coua (Coua delalandei)
 Saint Helena cuckoo (Nannococcyx psix)

Order Falconiformes

 Family Falconidae
 Guadalupe caracara (Caracara lutosa)
 Réunion kestrel (Falco duboisi)

Order Galliformes

 Family Phasianidae
 New Zealand quail (Coturnix novaezelandiae)

Order Gruiformes

 Family Rallidae
 Red rail (Aphanapteryx bonasia)
 Saint Helena rail (Atlantisia podarces)
 Chatham rail (Cabalus modestus)
 Hawkins' rail (Diaphorapteryx hawkinsi)
 Réunion rail (Dryolimnas augusti)
 Rodrigues rail (Erythromachus leguati)
 Mascarene coot (Fulica newtonii)
 Tristan moorhen (Gallinula nesiotis)
 Bar-winged rail (Nesoclopeus poeciloptera)
 Dieffenbach's rail (Hypotaenidia dieffenbachii)
 Tahiti rail (Hypotaenidia pacifica)
 Wake Island rail (Hypotaenidia wakensis)
 Ascension crake (Mundia elpenor)
 Lord Howe swamphen (Porphyrio albus)
 Réunion swamphen (Porphyrio coerulescens)
 New Caledonian gallinule (Porphyrio kukwiedei)
 North Island takahē (Porphyrio mantelli)
 Marquesas swamphen (Porphyrio paepae)
 Hodgens' waterhen (Tribonyx hodgenorum)
 Saint Helena crake (Zapornia astrictocarpus)
 Kosrae crake (Zapornia monasa)
 Tahiti crake (Zapornia nigra)
 Laysan rail (Zapornia palmeri)
 Hawaiian rail (Zapornia sandwichensis)

Order Passeriformes

 Family Acanthisittidae
 Lyall's wren (Traversia lyalli)
 Bushwren (Xenicus longipes)
 Family Acanthizidae
 Lord Howe gerygone (Gerygone insularis)
 Family Acrocephalidae
 Mangareva reed warbler (Acrocephalus astrolabii)
 Nightingale reed warbler (Acrocephalus luscinius)
 Garrett's reed warbler (Acrocephalus musae)
 Aguiguan reed warbler (Acrocephalus nijoi)
 Pagan reed warbler (Acrocephalus yamashinae)
 Family Callaeatidae
 Huia (Heteralocha acutirostris)
 Family Fringillidae
 Oahu 'akialoa (Akialoa ellisiana)
 Maui Nui 'akialoa (Akialoa lanaiensis)
 Lesser ʻakialoa (Akialoa obscura)
 Kauaʻi ʻakialoa (Akialoa stejnegeri)
 Bonin grosbeak (Carpodacus ferreorostris or Chaunoproctus ferreorostris)
 Kona grosbeak (Chloridops kona)
 ʻUla-ʻai-hawane (Ciridops anna)
 Black mamo (Drepanis funerea)
 Hawaii mamo (Drepanis pacifica)
 Lāna'i hookbill (Dysmorodrepanis munroi)
 Oahu 'akialoa (Hemignathus ellisianus)
 Oʻahu nukupuʻu (Hemignathus lucidus)
 Lesser ʻakialoa (Hemignathus obscurus)
 Greater ʻamakihi (Hemignathus sagittirostris)
 Laysan honeycreeper (Himatione fraithii)
 Oʻahu ʻakepa (Loxops wolstenholmei)
 Kākāwahie (Paroreomyza flammea)
 Lesser koa finch (Rhodacanthis flaviceps)
 Greater koa finch (Rhodacanthis palmeri)
 Greater ʻamakihi (Viridonia sagittirostris)
 Family Icteridae
 Slender-billed grackle (Quiscalus palustris)
 Family Locustellidae
 Chatham fernbird (Poodytes rufescens)
 Family Meliphagidae
 Chatham bellbird (Anthornis melanocephala)
 Family Mohoidae
 Kioea (Chaetoptila angustipluma)
 Oʻahu ʻōʻō (Moho apicalis)
 Bishop's ʻōʻō (Moho bishopi)
 Kauaʻi ʻōʻō (Moho braccatus)
 Hawaiʻi ʻōʻō (Moho nobilis)
 Family Monarchidae
 Guam flycatcher (Myiagra freycineti)
 Eiao monarch (Pomarea fluxa)
 Nuku Hiva monarch (Pomarea nukuhivae)
 Maupiti monarch (Pomarea pomarea)
 Family Passerellidae
 Bermuda towhee (Pipilo naufragus)
 Family Ploceidae
 Réunion fody (Foudia delloni)
 Family Sturnidae
 Kosrae starling (Aplonis corvina)
 Tasman starling (Aplonis fusca)
 Mauke starling (Aplonis mavornata)
 Raiatea starling (Aplonis ulietensis)
 Hoopoe starling (Fregilupus varius)
 Rodrigues starling (Necropsar rodericanus)
 Family Sylviidae
 Chatham fernbird (Bowdleria rufescens)
 Aldabra brush warbler (Nesillas aldabrana)
 Family Turdidae
 Kāmaʻo (Myadestes myadestinus)
 ʻĀmaui (Myadestes woahensis)
 Grand Cayman thrush (Turdus ravidus)
 Bonin thrush (Zoothera terrestris)
 Family Turnagridae
 South Island piopio (Turnagra capensis)
 North Island piopio (Turnagra tanagra)
 Family Tyrannidae
 San Cristóbal flycatcher (Pyrocephalus dubius)
 Family Zosteropidae
 Bridled white-eye (Zosterops conspicillatus)
 Marianne white-eye (Zosterops semiflavus)
 Robust white-eye (Zosterops strenuus)

Order Pelecaniformes

 Family Ardeidae
 New Zealand bittern (Ixobrychus novaezelandiae)
 Bermuda night heron (Nyctanassa carcinocatactes)
 Réunion night heron (Nycticorax duboisi)
 Mauritius night heron (Nycticorax mauritianus)
 Rodrigues night heron (Nycticorax megacephalus)
 Family Threskiornithidae
 Réunion ibis (Threskiornis solitarius)

Order Piciformes

 Family Picidae
 Bermuda flicker (Colaptes oceanicus)

Order Podicipediformes

 Family Podicipedidae
 Colombian grebe (Podiceps andinus)
 Atitlán grebe (Podilymbus gigas)
 Alaotra grebe (Tachybaptus rufolavatus)

Order Procellariiformes

 Family Procellariidae
 Olson's petrel (Bulweria bifax)
 Saint Helena petrel (Pterodroma rupinarum)

Order Psittaciformes

 Family Nestoridae
 Norfolk kaka (Nestor productus)
 Family Psittacidae
 Martinique amazon (Amazona martinicana)
 Guadeloupe amazon (Amazona violacea)
 Cuban macaw (Ara tricolor)
 Carolina parakeet (Conuropsis carolinensis)
 Society parakeet (Cyanoramphus ulietanus)
 Black-fronted parakeet (Cyanoramphus zealandicus)
 Oceanic eclectus parrot (Eclectus infectus)
 Mascarene grey parakeet (Lophopsittacus bensoni)
 Broad-billed parrot (Lophopsittacus mauritianus)
 Mascarene parrot (Mascarinus mascarin)
 Rodrigues parrot (Necropsittacus rodricanus)
 Paradise parrot (Psephotellus pulcherrimus)
 Guadeloupe parakeet (Psittacara labati)
 Newton's parakeet (Psittacula exsul)
 Seychelles parakeet (Psittacula wardi)

Order Strigiformes

 Family Strigidae
 Bermuda saw-whet owl (Aegolius gradyi)
 Réunion scops owl (Mascarenotus grucheti)
 Rodrigues scops owl (Mascarenotus murivorus)
 Mauritius scops owl (Mascarenotus sauzieri)
 Laughing owl (Sceloglaux albifacies)

Order Struthioniformes

 Family Casuariidae
 King Island emu (Dromaius novaehollandiae minor)
 Kangaroo Island emu (Dromaius novaehollandiae baudinianus)
 Tasmanian emu (Dromaius novaehollandiae diemenensis)

Order Suliformes

 Family Phalacrocoracidae
 Spectacled cormorant (Phalacrocorax perspicillatus)

Cephalaspidomorphi

Order Petromyzontiformes

 Family Petromyzontidae
 Eudontomyzon sp. nov. 'migratory'

Class Mammalia

Order Carnivora

 Family Canidae
 Falkland Islands wolf (Dusicyon australis)
 Dusicyon avus
 Japanese Wolf
 Hokkaido Wolf
 Family Felidae
 Bali Tiger
 Caspian Tiger
 Java Tiger
 Family Eupleridae
 Cryptoprocta spelea
 Family Mustelidae
 Sea mink (Neogale macrodon)
 Family Otariidae
 Japanese sea lion (Zalophus japonicus)
 Family Phocidae
 Caribbean monk seal (Neomonachus tropicalis)
 Family Ursidae
 Atlas Bear
 California grizzly bear

Order Artiodactyla

 Family Bovidae
 Aurochs (Bos primigenius)
 Queen of Sheba's gazelle (Gazella bilkis)
 Bluebuck (Hippotragus leucophaeus)
 Carpathian wisent
 Caucasian wisent
 Family Cervidae
 Schomburgk's deer (Rucervus schomburgki)
 Family Equidae
 Quagga
 Family Hippopotamidae
 Malagasy hippopotamus (Hippopotamus lemerlei)
 Malagasy pygmy hippopotamus (Choeropsis madagascariensis)

Order Chiroptera

 Family Vespertilionidae
 Christmas Island pipistrelle (Pipistrellus murrayi)
Lord Howe long-eared bat (Nyctophilus howensis)
Bonin Pipistrelle (Pipistrellus sturdeei)
 Family Pteropodidae
 Dusky flying fox (Pteropus forensic)
 Large Palau flying fox (Pteropus pilosus)
 Large Samoan flying fox (Pteropus coxi)
 Small Mauritian flying fox (Pteropus subniger)
 Guam flying fox (Pteropus tokudae)

Order Dasyuromorphia

 Family Thylacinidae
 Thylacine (Thylacinus cynocephalus)

Order Didelphimorphia

 Family Didelphidae
 Red-bellied gracile opossum (Cryptonanus ignitus)

Order Diprotodontia

 Family Macropodidae
 Lake Mackay hare-wallaby (Lagorchestes asomatus)
 Eastern hare-wallaby (Lagorchestes leporides)
 Toolache wallaby (Macropus greyi)
 Crescent nail-tail wallaby (Onychogalea lunata)
 Family Potoroidae
 Desert bettong (Bettongia anhydra)
 Nullarbor dwarf bettong (Bettongia pusilla)
 Desert rat-kangaroo (Caloprymnus campestris)
 Broad-faced potoroo (Potorous platyops)

Order Eulipotyphla

 Family Nesophontidae
 Puerto Rican nesophontes (Nesophontes edithae)
 Atalaye nesophontes (Nesophontes hypomicrus)
 Greater Cuban nesophontes (Nesophontes major)
 Western Cuban nesophontes (Nesophontes micrus)
 St. Michel nesophontes (Nesophontes paramicrus)
 Haitian nesophontes (Nesophontes zamicrus)
 Family Solenodontidae
 Marcano's solenodon (Solenodon marcanoi)

Order Lagomorpha

 Family Prolagidae
 Sardinian pika (Prolagus sardus)

Order Peramelemorphia

 Family Chaeropodidae
 Pig-footed bandicoot (Chaeropus ecaudatus)
 Family Peramelidae
 Desert bandicoot (Perameles eremiana)
 Family Thylacomyidae
 Lesser bilby (Macrotis leucura)

Order Primates

 Family Palaeopropithecidae
 Palaeopropithecus ingens
 Family Pitheciidae
 Jamaican monkey (Xenothrix mcgregori)

Order Rodentia

 Family Capromyidae
 Cuban coney (Geocapromys columbianus)
 Little Swan Island hutia (Geocapromys thoracatus)
 Imposter hutia (Hexolobodon phenax)
 Montane hutia (Isolobodon montanus)
 Puerto Rican hutia (Isolobodon portoricensis)
 Samaná hutia (Plagiodontia ipnaeum)
 Family Chinchillidae
 Lagostomus crassus
 Family Cricetidae
 Candango mouse (Juscelinomys candango)
 Martinique giant rice rat (Megalomys desmarestii)
 Saint Lucia giant rice-rat (Megalomys luciae)
 Galapagos giant rat (Megaoryzomys curioi)
 Anthony's woodrat (Neotoma anthonyi)
 Bunker's woodrat (Neotoma bunkeri)
 San Martín Island woodrat (Neotoma martinensis)
 Darwin's nesoryzomys (Nesoryzomys darwini)
Santa Cruz nesoryzomys (Nesoryzomys indefessus)
Vespucci's rodent (Noronhomys vespuccii)
 St. Vincent colilargo (Oligoryzomys victus)
 Jamaican rice rat (Oryzomys antillarum)
 Oryzomys nelsoni
 Pennatomys nivalis
 Pemberton's deer mouse (Peromyscus pembertoni)
 Family Echimyidae
 Oriente cave rat (Boromys offella)
 Torre's cave rat (Boromys torrei)
 Hispaniolan edible rat (Brotomys voratus)
 Insular cave rat (Heteropsomys insulans)
 Family Muridae
White-footed rabbit-rat (Conilurus albipes)
 Capricorn rabbit rat (Conilurus capricornensis)
 Buhler's coryphomys (Coryphomys buehleri)
 Lesser stick-nest rat (Leporillus apicalis)
 Bramble Cay melomys (Melomys rubicola)
 Short-tailed hopping mouse (Notomys amplus)
 Long-tailed hopping mouse (Notomys longicaudatus)
 Big-eared hopping mouse (Notomys macrotis)
 Darling Downs hopping mouse (Notomys mordax)
 Great hopping mouse (Notomys robustus)
 Pseudomys auritus
 Blue-gray mouse (Pseudomys glaucus)
 Gould's mouse (Pseudomys gouldii)
 Maclear's rat (Rattus macleari)
 Bulldog rat (Rattus nativitatis)

Order Sirenia

 Family Dugongidae
 Steller's sea cow (Hydrodamalis gigas)

Class Reptilia

Order Squamata

 Family Bolyeridae
 Round Island burrowing boa (Bolyeria multocarinata)
 Family Cordylidae
 Eastwood's long-tailed seps (Tetradactylus eastwoodae)
 Family Dipsadidae
 Underwood's mussurana (Clelia errabunda)
 Barbados racer (Erythrolamprus perfuscus)
 Family Gekkonidae
 Delcourt's giant gecko (Hoplodactylus delcourti)
 Rodrigues day gecko (Phelsuma edwardnewtoni) 
 Rodrigues giant day gecko (Phelsuma gigas)
 Family Scincidae
 Alinea luciae
 Copeoglossum redondae
 Mauritian giant skink (Leiolopisma mauritiana)
 Cape Verde giant skink (Macroscincus coctei)
 Tonga ground skink (Tachygyia microlepis)
 Family Teiidae
 Ameiva cineracea
 Martinique giant ameiva (Ameiva major)
 Contomastix charrua
 Family Tropiduridae
 Leiocephalus cuneus
 Navassa curly-tailed lizard (Leiocephalus eremitus)
 Martinique curly-tailed lizard (Leiocephalus herminieri)
 Family Typhlopidae
 Typhlops cariei

Order Testudines

 Family Testudinidae
 Pinta Island giant tortoise (Chelonoidis abingdonii)
 Floreana Island giant tortoise (Chelonoidis nigra)
 Réunion giant tortoise (Cylindraspis indica)
 Saddle-backed Mauritius giant tortoise (Cylindraspis inepta)
 Domed Rodrigues giant tortoise (Cylindraspis peltastes)
 Domed Mauritius giant tortoise (Cylindraspis triserrata)
 Saddle-backed Rodrigues giant tortoise (Cylindraspis vosmaeri)

Phylum Mollusca

Class Bivalvia

Order Unionida

 Family Unionidae
 Coosa elktoe (Alasmidonta mccordi)
 Carolina elktoe (Alasmidonta robusta)
 Ochlockonee arcmussel (Alasmidonta wrightiana)
 Arc-form pearly mussel (Epioblasma arcaeformis)
 Angled riffleshell (Epioblasma biemarginata)
 Arcuate pearly mussel (Epioblasma flexuosa)
 Epioblasma florentina florentina
 Acorn pearly mussel (Epioblasma haysiana)
 Narrow catspaw (Epioblasma lenior)
 Forkshell (Epioblasma lewisii)
 Fine-rayed pearly mussel (Epioblasma personata)
 Nearby pearly mussel (Epioblasma propinqua)
 Sampson's naiad (Epioblasma sampsonii)
 Cumberland leafshell (Epioblasma stewardsonii)
 Epioblasma torulosa gubernaculum
 Epioblasma torulosa torulosa
 Turgid riffle shell (Epioblasma turgidula)
 Germainaia geayi
 Lined pocketbook (Lampsilis binominata)
 Leptodea fragilis (Medionidus mcglameriae)
 Highnut (Pleurobema altum)
 Hazel pigtoe (Pleurobema avellanum)
 Scioto pigtoe (Pleurobema bournianum)
 Yellow pigtoe (Pleurobema flavidulum)
 Brown pigtoe (Pleurobema hagleri)
 Georgia pigtoe (Pleurobema hanleyianum)
 Alabama pigtoe (Pleurobema johannis)
 Coosa pigtoe (Pleurobema murrayense)
 Longnut (Pleurobema nucleopsis)
 Dark pigtoe (Pleurobema rubellum)
 Heavy pigtoe (Pleurobema taitianum)
 Alabama clubshell (Pleurobema troschelianum)
 True pigtoe (Pleurobema verum)
 Unio cariei
 Unio madagascariensis
 Unio malgachensis

Class Gastropoda

Architaenioglossa

 Family Cyclophoridae
 Cyclophorus horridulum
 Cyclosurus mariei
 Family Diplommatinidae
 Plectostoma sciaphilum
 Family Neocyclotidae
 Amphicyclotulus guadeloupensis
 Incerticyclus cinereus
 Incerticyclus martinicensis

Hygrophila

 Family Physidae
 Fish Lake physa (Physella microstriata)
 Family Planorbidae
 Shoal sprite (Amphigyra alabamensis)
 Neoplanorbis carinatus
 Neoplanorbis smithi
 Neoplanorbis umbilicatus
 Acorn ramshorn (Planorbella multivolvis)

Littorinimorpha

 Family Hydrobiidae
 Angrobia dulvertonensis
 Beddomeia tumida
 Belgrandiella intermedia
 Bythinella intermedia
 Cahaba pebblesnail (Clappia cahabensis)
 Clappia umbilicata
 Graecoanatolica macedonica
 Littoridina gaudichaudii
 Ohridohauffenia drimica
 Posticobia norfolkensis
 Corded purg (Pyrgulopsis nevadensis)
 Pyrgulopsis olivacea
 Reverse pebblesnail (Somatogyrus alcoviensis)
 Ouachita pebblesnail (Somatogyrus amnicoloides)
 Thick-lipped pebblesnail (Somatogyrus crassilabris)
 Channeled pebblesnail (Somatogyrus wheeleri)
 Family Littorinidae
 Littoraria flammea
 Family Pomatiidae
 Tropidophora desmazuresi
 Tropidophora semilineata

Patellogastropoda

 Family Lottiidae
 Lottia alveus
 Family Nacellidae
 Collisella edmitchelli

Sorbeoconcha

 Family Pleuroceridae
 Boulder snail (Athearnia crassa)
 Short-spired elimia (Elimia brevis)
 Closed elimia (Elimia clausa)
 Elimia fusiformis
 Elimia gibbera
 High-spired elimia (Elimia hartmaniana)
 Constricted elimia (Elimia impressa)
 Hearty elimia (Elimia jonesi)
 Elimia lachryma
 Ribbed elimia (Elimia laeta)
 Elimia macglameriana
 Rough-lined elimia (Elimia pilsbryi)
 Pupa elimia (Elimia pupaeformis)
 Pygmy elimia (Elimia pygmaea)
 Cobble elimia (Elimia vanuxemiana)
 Puzzle elimia (Elimia varians)
 Excised slitshell (Gyrotoma excisa)
 Striate slitshell (Gyrotoma lewisii)
 Pagoda slitshell (Gyrotoma pagoda)
 Ribbed slitshell (Gyrotoma pumila)
 Pyramid slitshell (Gyrotoma pyramidata)
 Round slitshell (Gyrotoma walkeri)
 Agate rocksnail (Leptoxis clipeata)
 Oblong rocksnail (Leptoxis compacta)
 Interrupted rocksnail (Leptoxis foremanii)
 Maiden rocksnail (Leptoxis formosa)
 Rotund rocksnail (Leptoxis ligata)
 Lyrate rocksnail (Leptoxis lirata)
 Bigmouth rocksnail (Leptoxis occultata)
 Coosa rocksnail (Leptoxis showalterii)
 Leptoxis torrefacta
 Striped rocksnail (Leptoxis vittata)

Stylommatophora

Kingdom Plantae

Division Bryophyta

Class Bryopsida

Order Bryales

 Family Brachytheciaceae
 Flabellidium spinosum
 Family Neckeraceae
 Neomacounia nitida

Class Marchantiopsida

Division Polypodiophyta

Class Polypodiopsida

Order Polypodiales

 Family Pteridaceae
 Adiantum lianxianense
 Dryopteris ascensionis

Division Rhodophyta

Class Florideophyceae

Order Ceramiales

 Family Delesseriaceae
 Vanvoorstia bennettiana

Division Tracheophyta

Class Liliopsida

Order Cyperales

 Family Cyperaceae
 Cyperus rockii
 Family Gramineae
 Cenchrus agrimonioides var. laysanensis
 Sporobolus durus

Class Magnoliopsida

Order Apiales

 Family Umbelliferae
 Sanicula kauaiensis

Order Asterales

 Family Compositae
 Argyroxiphium virescens
 Commidendrum gummiferum
 Commidendrum robustum ssp. gummiferum
 Delilia inelegans
 Fitchia mangarevensis
 Pluchea glutinosa
 Psiadia schweinfurthii

Order Campanulales

 Family Campanulaceae
 Clermontia multiflora
 Cyanea arborea
 Cyanea comata
 Cyanea copelandii ssp. copelandii
 Cyanea cylindrocalyx
 Cyanea dolichopoda
 Cyanea eleeleensis
 Cyanea giffardii
 Cyanea linearifolia
 Cyanea marksii
 Cyanea mauiensis
 Cyanea minutiflora
 Cyanea parvifolia
 Cyanea pohaku
 Cyanea pycnocarpa
 Cyanea quercifolia
 Cyanea sessilifolia
 Cyanea superba ssp. regina
 Delissea niihauensis
 Delissea subcordata
 Delissea undulata ssp. kauaiensis
 Delissea undulata ssp. niihauensis

Order Caryophyllales

 Family Amaranthaceae
 Achyranthes atollensis
 Blutaparon rigidum
 Family Caryophyllaceae
 Schiedea amplexicaulis

Order Celastrales

 Family Aquifoliaceae
 Ilex gardneriana
 Ilex ternatiflora

Order Dipsacales

 Family Valerianaceae
 Valerianella affinis

Order Ebenales

 Family Sapotaceae
 Chrysophyllum januariense
 Madhuca insignis
 Pouteria stenophylla
 Pradosia argentea
 Pradosia glaziovii
 Pradosia mutisii

Order Euphorbiales

 Family Euphorbiaceae
 Acalypha rubrinervis
 Acalypha wilderi
 Chamaesyce celastroides var. tomentella
 Chamaesyce remyi var. hanaleiensis
 Cnidoscolus fragrans

Order Fabales

 Family Leguminosae
 Astragalus nitidiflorus
 Crudia zeylanica
 Cynometra beddomei
 Erythrina schliebenii
 Ormosia howii
 Streblorrhiza speciosa

Order Gentianales

 Family Apocynaceae
 Ochrosia nukuhivensis
 Ochrosia tahitensis

Order Lamiales

 Family Boraginaceae
 Heliotropium pannifolium

Order Laurales

 Family Hernandiaceae
 Hernandia drakeana

Order Malvales

 Family Malvaceae
 Hibiscadelphus bombycinus
 Hibiscadelphus crucibracteatus
 Hibiscadelphus wilderianus
 Kokia lanceolata
 Family Sterculiaceae
 Byttneria ivorensis
 Sterculia khasiana
 Trochetiopsis melanoxylon

Order Myrtales

 Family Myrtaceae
 Campomanesia lundiana
 Gomidesia cambessedeana
 Myrcia skeldingii
 Psidium dumetorum
 Xanthostemon sebertii
 Family Thymelaeaceae
 Wikstroemia hanalei
 Wikstroemia skottsbergiana
 Wikstroemia villosa

Order Proteales

 Family Proteaceae
 Stenocarpus dumbeensis

Order Rhamnales

 Family Rhamnaceae
 Nesiota elliptica

Order Rosales

 Family Chrysobalanaceae
 Licania caldasiana
 Family Cunoniaceae
 Weinmannia spiraeoides
 Family Rosaceae
 Acaena exigua

Order Gentianales

 Family Rubiaceae
 Coffea lemblinii
 Corynanthe brachythyrsus (syn. Pausinystalia brachythyrsum)
 Guettarda retusa
 Oldenlandia adscensionis
 Wendlandia angustifolia

Order Santalales
 Family Santalaceae
 Santalum fernandezianum

Order Sapindales

 Family Rutaceae
 Galipea ossana
 Melicope cruciata
 Melicope haleakalae
 Melicope macropus
 Melicope nealae
 Melicope obovata
 Pelea obovata
 Family Sapindaceae
 Cupaniopsis crassivalvis
 Otophora unilocularis

Order Scrophulariales

 Family Gesneriaceae
 Cyrtandra olona

Order Theales

 Family Dipterocarpaceae
 Dipterocarpus cinereus
 Hopea shingkeng

Order Violales

 Family Begoniaceae
 Begonia eiromischa
 Family Flacourtiaceae
 Casearia quinduensis
 Casearia tinifolia
 Ryania speciosa var. mutisii

References
 IUCN 2009. IUCN Red List of Threatened Species. Version 2009.2 <www.iucnredlist.org>. Source of the above list [Downloaded on 29 January 2010]: